The Boyertown Area School District is a large public school district which covers portions of Berks and Montgomery Counties in southeastern Pennsylvania. When the Boyertown Area School District was formed in 1953 it was one of the largest in the state, encompassing . In Berks County it covers the Boroughs of Bally, Bechtelsville and Boyertown and Colebrookdale Township, Douglass Township, Earl Township and Washington Township. In Montgomery County it covers Douglass Township, New Hanover Township and Upper Frederick Township.

According to 2006 local census data, Boyertown Area School District serves a resident population of 34,803. In 2009, the district residents’ per capita income was $22,792, while the median family income was $61,247. In the Commonwealth, the median family income was $49,501 and the United States median family income was $49,445, in 2010.

Schools 
The district operates six Elementary Schools, two Middle Schools (6th-8th) and one Senior High School (9th-12th).

Elementary schools
Boyertown Elementary School 
Colebrookdale Elementary School 
Earl Elementary School 
Gilbertsville Elementary School
New Hanover-Upper Frederick Elementary School  
Washington Elementary School 
Secondary schools
Boyertown Area Middle School-East Center 
Boyertown Area Middle School-West Center 
Boyertown Area Senior High School

Extracurriculars
The district offers a variety of clubs, activities and sports.

Sports
The district funds:

Boys
Baseball - AAAA
Basketball- AAAA
Cross Country - AAA
Football - AAAA
Golf - AAA
Indoor Track and Field - AAAA
Lacrosse - AAAA
Soccer - AAA
Swimming and Diving - AAA
Tennis - AAA
Track and Field - AAA
Wrestling - AAA

Girls
Basketball - AAAA
Cross Country - AAA
Indoor Track and Field - AAAA
Field Hockey - AAA
Lacrosse - AAAA
Soccer (Fall) - AAA
Softball - AAAA
Swimming and Diving - AAA
Girls' Tennis - AAA
Track and Field - AAA

Junior High School Sports

Boys
Baseball
Basketball
Football
Soccer
Track and Field
Wrestling	

Girls
Baseball
Field Hockey
Lacrosse
Soccer (Fall)
Softball 
Track and Field

According to PIAA directory July 2012

References

External links 

Berks County Intermediate Unit 

School districts established in 1953
School districts in Berks County, Pennsylvania
School districts in Montgomery County, Pennsylvania
1953 establishments in Pennsylvania